Crenavolva is a genus of sea snails, marine gastropod mollusks in the subfamily Eocypraeinae  of the family Ovulidae.

Species
Species within the genus Crenavolva include:
Crenavolva aureola (Fehse, 2002)
Crenavolva cruenta Gowlett-Holmes & Holmes, 1989
 Crenavolva frumentum (G. B. Sowerby I, 1828)
Crenavolva grovesi Lorenz & Fehse, 2009
Crenavolva guidoi Fehse, 2002
Crenavolva janae Lorenz & Fehse, 2009
Crenavolva leopardus Fehse, 2002
Crenavolva marmorata Fehse, 2007
Crenavolva martini Fehse, 1999
Crenavolva matsumiyai Azuma, 1974
Crenavolva nanshaensis Ma & Zhang, 1996
Crenavolva philippei Lorenz & Fehse, 2009
Crenavolva striatula (Sowerby, 1828)
Crenavolva tinctura (Garrard, 1963)
Crenavolva tokuoi Azuma, 1989
Crenavolva traillii (A. Adams, 1855)
Crenavolva virgo (Azuma & Cate, 1971)
Crenavolva vitrea (Omi & Iino, 2005)

Species brought into synonymy
Crenavolva azumai (Cate, 1970): synonym of Dentiovula azumai (Cate, 1970)
Crenavolva chiapponii Lorenz & Fehse, 2009: synonym of Crenavolva aureola (Fehse, 2002)
Crenavolva chinensis Qi & Ma, 1983: synonym of Cuspivolva allynsmithi (Cate, 1978)
Crenavolva conspicua Cate, 1975: synonym of Rotaovula septemmacula (Azuma, 1974)
Crenavolva curiosa Cate, 1973: synonym of Dentiovula azumai (Cate, 1970)
Crenavolva cuspis Cate, 1973: synonym of Cuspivolva cuspis (Cate, 1973)
Crenavolva dondani (Cate, 1964): synonym of Serratovolva dondani (Cate, 1964)
Crenavolva draperi Cate & Azuma in Cate, 1973: synonym of Cuspivolva draperi Cate & Azuma in Cate, 1973
Crenavolva imitabilis Cate, 1973: synonym of Serratovolva dondani (Cate, 1964)
Crenavolva mucronata (Azuma & Cate, 1971): synonym of Cuspivolva mucronata (Azuma & Cate, 1971)
Crenavolva myrakeenae (Azuma & Cate, 1971): synonym of Dentiovula azumai (Cate, 1970)
Crenavolva ostheimerae Cate, 1973: synonym of Cuspivolva ostheimerae (Cate, 1973)
Crenavolva periopsis Cate, 1978: synonym of Crenavolva virgo (Azuma & Cate, 1971)
Crenavolva rosewateri Cate, 1973: synonym of Primovula rosewateri (Cate, 1973)
Crenavolva rostella Cate, 1973: synonym of Cuspivolva singularis (Cate, 1973)
Crenavolva testudiana (Cate, 1978): synonym of Sandalia meyeriana (Cate, 1973)
Crenavolva tigris (Yamamoto, 1971): synonym of Cuspivolva tigris (Yamamoto, 1971)

References

 Lorenz, F. & Fehse, D., 2009 The living Ovulidae. A manual of the families of allied cowries: Ovulidae, Pediculariidae and Eocypraeidae, p. 651 pp

External links
 Cate C.N. (1973). A systematic revision of the recent cypraeid family Ovulidae. The Veliger. 15 (supplement): 1-117

Ovulidae